Thanon Chira Junction railway station (SRT Code: CIY) ( (จร.)) is the main railway station in Nakhon Ratchasima Province, Thailand. The station is on the south side of the city moat in Nakhon Ratchasima. There are 18 daily trains serving the station. There are also four to six special trains during the Thai New Year, Songkran, and other festivals. In the 2008 census, Thanon Chira Junction railway station served nearly 350,000 passengers.

History
Thanon Chira Junction was opened on 1 November 1922 as the Thanon Chira railway station on part of the Tha Chang section of the Ubon Line (21 km). The station became a junction in 1934 once the line to Khon Kaen was completed, and opened on 1 April 1933. The location of the station is important because it is close to both Nakhon Ratchasima and the gate of Fort Suranaree (the headquarters of 2nd Army Region). Initially, the station was a wooden structure until after World War II, when a concrete structure replaced the dilapidated wooden station. The station has a container crane to handle container loading.

Train services
 Diesel rail car special express train No. 21 from Bangkok to Ubon Ratchathani
 Diesel rail car special express train No. 22 from Ubon Ratchathani to Bangkok
 Express train No. 67 from Bangkok to Ubon Ratchathani
 Express train No. 68 from Ubon Ratchathani to Bangkok
 Diesel rail car express train No. 71 from Bangkok to Ubon Ratchathani
 Diesel rail car express train No. 72 from Ubon Ratchathani to Bangkok
 Diesel rail car express train No. 77 from Bangkok to Nong Khai
 Diesel rail car express train No. 78 Nong Khai to Bangkok
 Rapid train No. 135 from Bangkok to Ubon Ratchathani
 Rapid train No. 136 from Ubon Ratchathani to Bangkok
 Rapid train No. 139 from Bangkok to Ubon Ratchathani
 Rapid train No. 140 from Ubon Ratchathani to Bangkok
 Rapid train No. 141 from Bangkok to Ubon Ratchathani
 Rapid train No. 142 from Ubon Ratchathani to Bangkok
 Rapid train No. 145 from Bangkok to Ubon Ratchathani
 Rapid train No. 146 from Ubon Ratchathani to Bangkok
 Ordinary train No. 233 from Bangkok to Surin
 Ordinary train No. 234 from Surin to Bangkok
 Local train No. 415 from Nakhon Ratchasima to Nong Khai
 Local train No. 418 from Nong Khai to Nakhon Ratchasima
 Local train No. 416 from Nakhon Ratchasima to Udon Thani
 Local train No. 417 from Udon Thani to Nakhon Ratchasima
 Local train No. 419 from Nakhon Ratchasima to Ubon Ratchathani
 Local train No. 420 from Ubon Ratchathani to Nakhon Ratchasima
 Local train No. 421 from Nakhon Ratchasima to Ubon Ratchathani
 Local train No. 426 from Ubon Ratchathani to Nakhon Ratchasima
 Local train No. 424 from Samrong Thap to Nakhon Ratchasima
 Local train No. 427 from Nakhon Ratchasima to Ubon Ratchathani
 Local train No. 428 from Ubon Ratchathani to Nakhon Ratchasima
 Local train No. 429 from Nakhon Ratchasima to Bua Yai Junction
 Local train No. 430 from Bua Yai Junction to Nakhon Ratchasima
 Local train No. 431 from Kaeng Khoi Junction to Khon Kaen
 Local train No. 432 from Khon Kaen to Kaeng Khoi Junction

References

External links
rotfaithai.com (Thai)

Railway stations in Thailand
Railway stations opened in 1922
Buildings and structures in Nakhon Ratchasima